The 2006–07 Major Indoor Soccer League season was the sixth season for the league.  The regular season started on November 4, 2006, and ended on April 7, 2007.

League Standings

Playoffs

Scoring leaders
GP = Games Played, G = Goals, A = Assists, Pts = Points

Source:

League awards
 Most Valuable Player: Jamar Beasley, Detroit
 Defender of the Year: Genoni Martinez, Philadelphia
 Rookie of the Year: Stephen Armstrong, Chicago
 Goalkeeper of the Year: Pete Pappas, Philadelphia
 Coach of the Year: Mark Pulisic, Detroit
 Championship Series Finals MVP: Don D'Ambra, Philadelphia

Sources:

All-MISL Teams

First Team

Second Team

All-Rookie Team

Source:

References

External links
Major Indoor Soccer League II (RSSSF)

Major Indoor Soccer League (2001–2008)
2006 in American soccer leagues
2007 in American soccer leagues
2006–07